Dendropsophus praestans is a species of frog in the family Hylidae.
It is endemic to Colombia.
Its natural habitats are subtropical or tropical moist montane forests, freshwater marshes, intermittent freshwater marshes, arable land, pastureland, plantations, rural gardens, heavily degraded former forest, and ponds.

References

praestans
Amphibians of Colombia
Amphibians described in 1983
Taxonomy articles created by Polbot